David Legge Brainard (December 21, 1856 – March 22, 1946) was a career officer in the United States Army. He enlisted in 1876, received his officer's commission in 1886, and served until 1919. Brainard attained the rank of brigadier general and served during World War I as U.S. military attaché in Lisbon, Portugal.

A native of Norway, New York, Brainard was raised and educated in Norway and nearby Freetown, and graduated from  the State Normal School in Cortland, New York.

In addition to his First World War service, Brainard was a veteran of the American Indian Wars, Spanish–American War, and Philippine–American War. He was also a noted arctic explorer who attained fame as one of only six survivors of the 1881 to 1884 Lady Franklin Bay Expedition. He was the recipient of several civilian awards in recognition of his explorations. He died in Washington, D.C., on March 22, 1946, and was buried at Arlington National Cemetery.

Early life 
Brainard was born in Norway, New York, the fifth son of Alanson Brainard and Maria C. Legge. His family moved to a farm in Freetown, New York, when he was ten years old, and Brainard was raised and educated in Norway and Freetown. He attended the State Normal School in Cortland, New York, and then decided upon a military career.

Military career

Start of career
Brainard enlisted in the United States Army in September 1876. He was assigned to the 2nd Cavalry Regiment  and served at Fort Keogh, Montana Territory during the Great Sioux War of 1876. On May 7, 1877, Brainard fought in the Battle of Little Muddy Creek, Montana, where he was wounded in the face and right hand. In August 1877, Brainard was one of four soldiers assigned to escort the Army's commanding general, William Tecumseh Sherman and Sherman's party on an inspection tour of Yellowstone National Park. In 1877 and 1878, he served under Nelson Appleton Miles in Montana during the Nez Perce War and Bannock War. He was promoted to corporal in October 1877, and sergeant in July 1879.

Arctic exploration 

In 1880, he was selected for the Howgate expedition, which started for Greenland in July 1880, but turned back after a heavy storm damaged the expedition's ship. In 1881, he was detailed as first sergeant for the Lady Franklin Bay Expedition, which was commanded by Adolphus Greely. Over the three years of this expedition he continuously kept a journal.

Twenty-five men began the expedition, which ran into difficulty when several attempts to resupply it failed, and several rescue attempts were forced to turn back. Among those who died was James Booth Lockwood, second-in-command and Brainard's companion on many excursions, including their record breaking push north to latitude 83°23 '30". Brainard wrote:

Brainard was later credited with saving as many expedition members as possible by closely rationing the group's limited food. Shortly before the survivors were rescued in the spring of 1884, Brainard, freezing, starving, and suffering from scurvy wrote: "Our own condition is so wretched, so palpably miserable, that death would be welcomed rather than feared ..." Brainard was one of only six survivors rescued by Rear Admiral Winfield Scott Schley on June 22. On that day, he was reportedly near death himself, too weak to hold a pencil so he could make an entry in his log.

Later career 

In January 1885, Brainard sought a commission in the 10th Infantry Regiment, but the appointment went to Andre W. Brewster. In 1886, he was commissioned a second lieutenant in the 2nd Cavalry "as recognition of the gallant and meritorious services rendered by him in the Arctic expedition of 1881–1884." He then had the distinction of being the only living US Army officer, active or retired, who had been commissioned as a commendation for specific services.

Brainard was promoted to first lieutenant in August 1893. In October 1896 he transferred to the Subsistence Department and received promotion to captain. In December 1897, he participated in the Yukon Relief Mission, which provided emergency assistance to Klondike Gold Rush miners who were experiencing shortages of food.

In May 1898, Brainard was promoted to temporary lieutenant colonel and he served as chief commissary of the military forces in the Philippines during the Spanish–American War in 1898 and Philippine–American War in 1899. In May 1900, he was promoted to permanent major. His subsequent assignments included chief commissary of the Department of the East, Department of California, and Philippine Division. In 1905, Brainard received promotion to permanent lieutenant colonel. Brainard was a charter member of The Explorers Club and served its president from 1912 to 1913. He was promoted to colonel in June 1912.

In 1914, Brainard was assigned as U.S. military attaché in Buenos Aires, Argentina. In October 1917, Brainard received promotion to temporary brigadier general. During World War I, he served as military attaché in Lisbon, Portugal, and he retired as a brigadier general in October 1919.

Family
Brainard married Anna Chase in 1888, and they divorced in 1893. In 1917, he married Sara Hall Guthrie (1880–1953). Brainard had no children and was the stepfather of his second wife's daughter Elinor.

Retirement and death

After leaving the Army, Brainard was appointed vice president of the Association of Army and Navy Stores, and was named to the association's board of directors. He remained active in these roles until his death.

He was elected an honorary member of the American Polar Society in 1936, on his 80th birthday.

Brainard died at Walter Reed Army Medical Center in Washington, D.C. on March 22, 1946. He was buried at Arlington National Cemetery. He was the last survivor of the Greely Arctic Expedition.

Awards

Military awards

The Purple Heart medal was created in 1932. On January 27, 1933, Brainard received the award for wounds he sustained at the Battle of Little Muddy Creek on May 7, 1877. His was one of only two Purple Hearts known to have been awarded for the American Indian Wars, because posthumous awards were not authorized and eligible individuals had to proactively submit applications.

Including the Purple Heart, Brainard's military awards and decorations included:

Purple Heart
Indian Campaign Medal
Spanish Campaign Medal
Philippine Campaign Medal
World War I Victory Medal
Military Order of Christ (Grand Officer) (Portugal)
Military Order of Aviz (Grand Officer) (Portugal)
Legion of Honor (Officer) (France)

Civilian awards
In addition to his military awards, Brainard received the Royal Geographical Society's Back Award in 1886. He was a fellow of the American Geographical Society, and his arctic explorations resulted in award of the society's Charles P. Daly Medal in 1926. He was also a 1929 recipient of the civilian Explorers Club Medal.

Publications

Notes

References

Bibliography

External links 

 
 
 
 The Papers of David L. Brainard at Dartmouth College Library
 Elinor McVickar Correspondence with Ellen R. Brainard at Dartmouth College Library

1856 births
1946 deaths
United States military attachés
Military personnel from New York (state)
American military personnel of the Indian Wars
American military personnel of the Spanish–American War
American Polar Society honorary members
Burials at Arlington National Cemetery
Explorers of the Arctic
People from Herkimer County, New York
United States Army generals of World War I
United States Army generals
Grand Officers of the Order of Christ (Portugal)
Grand Officers of the Order of Aviz
Officiers of the Légion d'honneur
State University of New York at Cortland alumni